IV - One With the Storm is the fourth and final studio album of the Finnish doom metal band Ghost Brigade. The album peaked at No. 16 on the Finnish Albums Chart.

Track listing

References

Ghost Brigade (band) albums
Season of Mist albums
2014 albums